West London College, legally known as the Ealing, Hammersmith and West London College is a large further and higher education college in West London, England, formed in 2002 by the merger between Ealing Tertiary College and Hammersmith and West London College. It is based across four campuses located in Park Royal, Ealing, Hammersmith and Southall districts; the main campus of the college is situated on the north side of the busy A4 dual-carriageway, between Hammersmith and Earls Court. There are over 13,000 students as of 2016, providing training and development from entry level to postgraduate.

It is a member of the Collab Group of high performing colleges.

History 

In 1881, Hammersmith School of Art was established in Brook Green. There was also the Hammersmith College of Art and Building located in Lime Grove, Shepherds Bush. This college ran an Architecture course accredited by the RIBA and an Interior Design course.  There were also facilities and studios in which were taught textile design, ceramics, sculpture and print-making. The 'building' side of the college included workshops in which the traditional building trades were taught, including plumbing, welding, plastering and brick-laying.  The 'cross-discipline' opportunities that the close proximity that these departments afforded students was deliberate.  That the sculpture students could learn from the welding classes (both instructors and apprentices) and the interior design students from the textile design students and the architecture students from the building trades apprentices was a recognized benefit of the graduates of the Hammersmith College of Art and Building. In 1970 the Architecture department of Hammersmith College of Art and Building merged with Woolwich Polytechnic to form Thames Polytechnic, which in 1993 became the University of Greenwich. The architectural teaching staff included Arthur Korn. In 1975 Hammersmith College of Art merged with West London College and forming Hammersmith and West London College.

Ealing Grammar School for Boys was opened in 1913 as Ealing County School and expanded in 1936, also known as Ealing County Grammar School. It had the Ealonian Hall. In 1974, Ealing borough adopted the comprehensive education system and the school became Ealing Green High School, a boys' school. Another institute Thomas Huxley College existed until 1980. In 1992, the school turned into Ealing Tertiary College.

The Southall Technical College was founded in 1929 as a technical school for boys, merging with Southall Grammar School in 1963 (now Villiers High School). The college's skills provision moved to the Norwood Hall Institute of Horticultural Education, and this became part of Ealing Tertiary College.

Acton Technical College is another former institution that is a predecessor of the current college.

In January 2002, Hammersmith and West London College merged with Ealing Tertiary College to form Ealing, Hammersmith and West London College. At the time it was the largest further education college in London with over 30,000 enrollments. It changed its public brand name to West London College from 2018.

Campuses

Hammersmith and Fulham College 

Hammersmith is the largest campus, with over 10,000 students. The College offers a large number of full-time and part-time courses across a broad range of subjects for students of different ages, abilities and needs.

The College was designed by the Greater London Council Architects’ Department, under the supervision of Bob Giles, the project architect, in a Brutalist style inspired by Alvar Aalto's Säynätsalo Town Hall. The construction was completed in 1980.

Park Royal Construction College 
The Park Royal campus, on Central Way, NW10, specialises in Construction Crafts, Carpentry & Joinery, Plumbing and Electrical installation and offers various construction courses which are delivered in purpose-built workshops. The Carpentry section has been hugely successful in skill build competitions over the years.

Ealing Green College 

Located at The Green in Ealing, it offers a range of full-time post-GCSE, academic and vocational courses, as well as tuition in ESOL and English as a Foreign Language (EFL). Recent refurbishments have significantly improved the Sixth Form Centre and a new £11.5m specialist centre, the Ealing Institute of Media, was launched in December 2005. It is situated in the former Ealing Green High School.

The Institute of Media at Ealing 
Opened in 2006 by former BBC Director-General Greg Dyke, The Ealing Institute of Media is a Centre of Vocational Excellence in Media. It is also part of the Skillset Screen Academy group. It was established to provide tailor-made courses that offer both vocational experience and education, along with the adequate amount of theory to provide students with what they need to have a successful career within the media industry.

Courses include the new Actor Prepares Bollywood acting school, standalone subjects such as Animation, Photography, and other areas at GCSE or Advanced Level. The college also offers BTEC qualifications that allow students to learn a wide variety of industry specific skills rather than just a small area.

The Ealing Institute of Media includes EIM Productions, a professional production company offering film and photography services to the college and external clients.

Southall Community College 
On Beaconsfield Road in Southall, students here have access to the Southall Sports Centre run by the London Borough of Ealing, the Sixth Form Centre, and separate facilities for adult learning and a vocational centre.

Acton
A former campus existed on Gunnersbury Lane, Acton.

Achievements and Awards

In its most recent inspection, Ofsted rated the college as "Good" for overall effectiveness. The college is a Beacon Status College, awarded by the Quality Improvement Agency. In 2008, the International Centre at the college was awarded the Queen's Award for Enterprise: International Trade. In 2012, West London College (then Ealing, Hammersmith and West London College) became the first Further Education college in London to receive the 'AoC Charter for International Excellence’. The charter is awarded to FE colleges that show a strong commitment to quality assurance and implement an ethical approach to all aspects of their international activities. In 2017, the college won the Times Educational Supplement FE Award for Outstanding use of Technology for Teaching, Learning and Assessment.

Former teachers
 Prof David Blake, composer (taught music at the boys' grammar school from 1961-2)
 David Tanner (taught history and Head of Sixth Form at Ealing Green)
 Arthur Korn (architect)
 Chris Tooke & Peter Brett (authors) Carpentry & Joinery publications
 Geoffrey Bocking, Keith Critchlow, Roland Whiteside, Harold Bartram, Henry Stephenson, Robin Baker, Anthony Sully - all taught Interior Design at Hammersmith College of Art and Building.
 Robyn Denny, Dick Smith, Bernard Cohen, Tom Simmons (Art), Mike Caddy(Ceramics), Keith Godwin, Henry Thornton (Sculpture), Paul Copplestone (Art History) all taught at Hammersmith College of Art and Building.

Alumni
 Prof Dianne Willcocks CBE, Vice-Chancellor since 1999 of York St John University
 Laurence Broderick ARBS FRSA, sculptor
 Ralph Miliband, father of Labour Leader Ed Miliband and David Miliband MP
 Trevor Baylis OBE, inventor
 Estelle, singer
 Jamal Edwards, founder of SBTV
 Shola Ama, singer
 Terri Walker, singer
 Marcus Brigstocke, comedian
 Syed Ahmed, businessman, 'The Apprentice' candidate and Asian Entrepreneur of the Year 2015
 Clarke Carlisle, former professional footballer
 Sir Steve McQueen, director
 David Ajala, actor
 Hajj Adam Babah-Alargi, Ghanaian engineer

The Ealing Grammar School for Boys

 Graham Barlow, cricketer
 John D Barrow FRS, Professor of Mathematical Sciences at Cambridge University, cosmologist, Templeton Prize winner and author of many popular science books and the award-winning play Infinities was born in Wembley in 1952 and attended Barham Primary School and Ealing Grammar School for Boys from 1964-71.
 Ken Bates, businessman and retired football club chairman. 
 John Beattie, rower, 1980 Moscow Olympics, Bronze Medal Coxless Four.
 Lee Brilleaux, musician with Dr. Feelgood
 Martin Cross, rower
 Prof Bill Durodie, academic
 Mike Edwards (musician), member of ELO
 Dr Richard Fortey, palaeontologist and President from 2007-8 of the Geological Society of London
 Air Marshal Sir Michael Giddings OBE DFC AFC, later chaired the public enquiries of four sections of the M25 in the 1970s, the A1/M1 Kirkhamgate-Dishforth scheme in 1982, and the controversial Archway extension in 1984
 Ian Gomm, musician/composer
 Robert Hokum, musician
 Sir Richard Greenbury, Chief Executive from 1988-99 of Marks & Spencer
 Allen Jones (artist)
 Brian Jones (poet)
 Harry Keen, diabetologist
 Richard Leonard, journalist and Labour MP from 1970-4 for Romford
 Ian McNuff, rower, 1980 Moscow Olympics, Bronze Medal Coxless Four.
 David Lloyd Meredith, actor
 Very Rev John Moses, Dean of St Paul's from 1996-2006
 Sir Gerald Nabarro, Conservative MP from 1950-64 for Kidderminster, and from 1966-73 for South Worcestershire
 Fred Perry, tennis player
 Don Ryder, Baron Ryder of Eaton Hastings, helped create the Ryder Report
 Very Rev Colin Slee OBE, Dean of Southwark from 1994-2010 and Chaplain of King's College London from 1976–82
 Prof George Temple CBE, FRS, Sedleian Professor of Natural Philosophy from 1953-68 at the University of Oxford, Professor of Mathematics from 1932-53 at King's College London, and Chairman from 1961-4 of the Aeronautical Research Council
 John Warr, cricketer
 Mark Whitby FREng, engineer

Ealing Green High School
 Umer Rashid, cricketer

References

External links

 College Website
 EduBase

Further education colleges in London
Further education colleges in the Collab Group
Education in the London Borough of Ealing
Education in the London Borough of Hammersmith and Fulham
Learning and Skills Beacons